Vanoise may refer to:
 Vanoise National Park in France
 Vanoise Express, a cable car line
 Vanoise Massif, a sub-group of the Graian Alps in France